A foil is a solid object with a shape such that when placed in a moving fluid at a suitable angle of attack the lift (force generated perpendicular to the fluid flow) is substantially larger than the drag (force generated parallel to the fluid flow).  If the fluid is a gas, the foil is called an airfoil or aerofoil, and if the fluid is water the foil is called a hydrofoil.

Physics of foils

A foil generates lift primarily because of its shape and angle of attack. When oriented at a suitable angle, the foil deflects the oncoming fluid, resulting in a force on the foil in the direction opposite to the deflection. This force can be resolved into two components: lift and drag.  This "turning" of the fluid in the vicinity of the foil creates curved streamlines which results in lower pressure on one side and higher pressure on the other.  This pressure difference is accompanied by a velocity difference, via Bernoulli's principle, so for foils with positive angles-of attack, and other than flat-plates, the resulting flowfield about the foil has a higher average velocity on the upper surface than on the lower surface.

A more detailed description of the flowfield is given by the simplified Navier–Stokes equations, applicable when the fluid is incompressible.  However, since the effects of the compressibility of air at low speeds is negligible, these simplified equations can be used for both airfoils and hydrofoils as long as the fluid flow is substantially less than the speed of sound (up to about Mach 0.3).

Basic design considerations
The simplest type of foil is a flat plate. When set at an angle (the angle of attack) to the flow the plate will deflect the fluid passing over and under it, and this deflection will result in a lift force on the plate. However, while it does generate lift, it also generates a large amount of drag.

Since even a flat plate can generate lift, a significant factor in foil design is the minimization of drag.  An example of this is the rudder of a boat or aircraft.  When designing a rudder a key design factor is the minimization of drag in its neutral position, which is balanced with the need to produce sufficient lift with which to turn the craft at a reasonable rate.
 

Other types of foils, both natural and man-made, seen both in air and water, have features that delay or control the onset of lift-induced drag, flow separation, and stall (see Bird flight, Fin, Airfoil, Placoid scale, Tubercle, Vortex generator, Canard (close-coupled), Blown flap, Leading edge slot, Leading edge slats), as well as Wingtip vortices (see Winglet).

Lifted ability in air and water

The weight a foil can lift is proportional to its lift coefficient, the density of the fluid, the foil area and its speed squared. The following shows the lifting ability of a flat plate with span 10 metres and area 10 square metres moving at a speed of 10 m/s at different altitudes and water depths. It uses the lift at an altitude of 11 km as a datum to show how the lift increases with decreasing altitude (increasing air density). It also shows the influence of ground effect and then the effect of increase in density going from air to water. 

 height 11 km:        lift  1.0 (datum for comparison)
        5 m                 3.4
  in ground effect          4.1
 water surface-planing     1,280
 just submerged            1,420
 depth  5 m                2,840
      10 km                2,860

See also

 Aircraft
 Bilgeboard
 Boomerang
 Centerboard
 Chord (aircraft)
 Coanda effect
 Diving plane
 Drag coefficient
 Flipper (anatomy)
 Fluid dynamics
 Formula One car
 Keel (hydrodynamic)
 Lift coefficient
 NACA airfoil
 Propeller
 Sail (aerodynamics)
 Skeg
 Spoiler (automotive)
 Surfboard fin
 Wing

References

External links
 Lift from Flow Turning
 What is Lift?
 Bernoulli and Newton
 Effect of Shape on Lift
 Incorrect Lift Theory
 Penguin can fly
  thresher shark swim towards scuba divers
 Swimming with Wild Dolphins
 Bird Flight II

Fluid dynamics
Aerodynamics